Bryan Allan Pamba (born 7 January 1992) is a French-Ivorian basketball player who plays for Rennes and . With the Ivorian national team, he played at the 2019 FIBA Basketball World Cup.

References

French men's basketball players
1992 births
Basketball players from Paris
Living people
Ivorian expatriate basketball people in France
Ivorian men's basketball players
2019 FIBA Basketball World Cup players
Poitiers Basket 86 players
Chorale Roanne Basket players
Lille Métropole BC players
Orléans Loiret Basket players
ALM Évreux Basket players
Hermine Nantes Basket players
Caen Basket Calvados players